This is a list of civil parishes in the ceremonial county of Greater London. The City of London is a ceremonial county in its own right and is listed separately. There is currently just one civil parish in Greater London, since all were abolished in 1965. Before this date the civil parish had only a nominal role as all parish councils in the area had been abolished by 1934. The right to create civil parishes in London boroughs was reintroduced by the Local Government and Public Involvement in Health Act 2007.

List of parishes
Queen's Park parish in the City of Westminster was created on 1 April 2014
The rest of Greater London is unparished.

See also
List of civil parishes in the County of London in 1891

References

External links
 Office for National Statistics : Geographical Area Listings

Cilvil parishes
 
Lists of civil parishes in England
Greater London